This is a list of counties in Scotland, ordered by population as at the 1951 census.

References
Vision of Britain - 1951 Census of Scotland: County Report

1951 United Kingdom census
1951 in Scotland